Allegations of antisemitism in the Labour Party of the United Kingdom (UK) have been made since Jeremy Corbyn was elected as leader of the party in September 2015. After comments by Naz Shah in 2014 and Ken Livingstone in 2016 resulted in their suspension from membership pending investigation, Corbyn established the Chakrabarti Inquiry, which concluded that the party was not "overrun by anti-Semitism or other forms of racism", although there was an "occasionally toxic atmosphere" and "clear evidence of ignorant attitudes". The Home Affairs Select Committee of Parliament held an inquiry into antisemitism in the UK in the same year and found "no reliable, empirical evidence to support the notion that there is a higher prevalence of antisemitic attitudes within the Labour Party than any other political party", though the leadership's lack of action "risks lending force to allegations that elements of the Labour movement are institutionally antisemitic".

In 2017, Labour Party rules were changed to make hate speech, including antisemitism, a disciplinary matter. In 2018, Corbyn was challenged for, in 2012, in response to a Facebook post from the artist, asking why "Freedom for Humanity", an allegedly antisemitic mural, was going to be removed and for having been a member of Facebook groups, mainly pro-Palestinian, containing antisemitic posts. In July of that year, Labour's National Executive Committee (NEC) adopted a definition of antisemitism, for disciplinary purposes, that included the International Holocaust Remembrance Alliance (IHRA) Working Definition, with modified examples relating to how criticism of Israel could stray into antisemitism. In September of that year, the NEC added all 11 IHRA examples, unamended, to the definition of antisemitism, and included them in the Party's code of conduct.

In February and July 2019, Labour issued information on investigations into complaints of antisemitism against individuals, with around 350 members resigning, being expelled or receiving formal warnings, equating to around 0.06% of the party's membership. Also in February 2019, nine MPs resigned from the party, citing Labour's leftward political direction and its handling of allegations of antisemitism and of Brexit – most of them then formed The Independent Group.

In May 2019, the Equality and Human Rights Commission (EHRC) announced an inquiry into whether Labour had "unlawfully discriminated against, harassed or victimised people because they are Jewish". In April 2020, a 860-page report by the party into its handling of antisemitism concluded that there was "no evidence" that antisemitism complaints were treated any differently than other forms of complaint, or of current or former staff being "motivated by antisemitic intent". In October 2020, the EHRC published its report, finding that the party was "responsible for unlawful acts of harassment and discrimination". The EHRC found that there were 23 instances of political interference by staff from the leader's office and others and that Labour had breached the Equality Act in two cases. Corbyn was suspended from the Labour Party and had the party whip removed on 29 October 2020 "for a failure to retract" his assertion that the scale of antisemitism within Labour had been overstated by opponents.

20th century

Second Boer War and "Jewish finance"

In the late 19th century, antisemitism was common throughout British society. This intensified during the Second Boer War (1899–1902) and came to include the labour movement, causing much dismay among socialist Jews. Liberal MP John Burns' views on the war were prone to antisemitic outbursts, and labour movement figures opposed to the war, such as Henry Hyndman, blamed "Jewish capitalists" for starting the war, which angered other members of the Social Democratic Federation. Liberal journalist J. A. Hobson wrote that the gold mines in South Africa "are almost entirely in their [Jews'] hands", and Labour Party founder Keir Hardie stated that Jewish financial houses were part of a secretive imperialist cabal that promoted war. According to Denis Judd and Keith Surridge in The Boer War: A History, the Independent Labour Party, the Trade Union Congress, and Robert Blatchford's The Clarion blamed "Jewish capitalists" as "being behind the war and imperialism in general."

Jewish immigration and the Balfour Declaration
From 1880 to 1921, Britain's Anglo-Jewish community grew fourfold from 80,000 to 317,000 due to immigration from Eastern Europe and the high birth rate of the arriving population. British Jews during the 20th century generally supported the labour movement. The UK arm of Poale Zion, a Jewish workers movement, called Poale Zion (Great Britain), later the Jewish Labour Movement, affiliated to the Labour Party in 1920. Many prominent Labour leaders had an affinity with the goals of Labour Zionism but were initially reluctant to press for parliamentary support for relieving obstacles to Jewish immigration to Palestine, given the party's commitment to an anti-imperialist policy. In 1920, they gave unqualified support to both the Balfour Declaration and the British Mandate for Palestine. The basic principles that evolved stressed (a) gradual growth of a Jewish homeland through selective immigration; (b) the formation of a binational society and (c) criticism of Zionism's separatist agenda.

Support for Israel
Generally, Labour support for Israel continued, in the expectancy that the Labour Zionist strand in Jewish state-building would lead to socialism and development in the Middle East generally. Ernest Bevin, Britain's Foreign Secretary from 1945 to 1951, was critical of Zionist goals; he argued that Jews should be convinced to resettle in Europe, and said that Americans supported Jewish immigration to Palestine because "they did not want too many Jews in New York". Bevin also voiced antisemitic canards between Jews and finance, as well as communism. There is no evidence that this affected his political decisions.

Growing sympathy for Palestine
Aberystwyth University's James R. Vaughn says the rise of a radical anti-Zionism in the Labour Party started with the creation of the Labour Middle East Council in 1969 by Christopher Mayhew. Dave Rich concurs that Mayhew founded the council in order to change the "pro-Israel" position of the Labour Party and references the influence of pro-Palestinian activists within the Young Liberals.

By the 1980s, with the election of Menachem Begin's Likud party, the emergence of messianic nationalism, neo-liberal economic reforms, the occupation of the West Bank and of the Gaza Strip, and the decline of the Israeli Labor Party, socialism declined in Israel. These factors contributed to falling Labour support for Israel, at the same time as there was growing sympathy for Palestinian aspirations for statehood. According to June Edmunds, Lecturer in Sociology of the University of Sussex, the party's leadership was initially supportive of Israel but shifted to support Palestine in the early 1980s, although the membership did not; later challenges to this shift eventually resulted in a more balanced view of both sides and broad support for a two-state solution. Edmunds credits the shift towards Palestine aspirations to more moderate appeals by Palestinians, a sharp shift to the right in Israeli politics and an increase in anti-colonial politics among the left.

Richard Seymour wrote in 2018 that "Palestinian rights have been a growing concern in the British Left since the 1982 Sabra and Shatila massacre" when "the British trade union movement and the Labour Party began to break with Israel in response". The Labour Committee on Palestine was formed in June 1982 to challenge the Labour Middle East Council, which supported a two-state solution, and to oppose the "Zionist state as racist, exclusivist, expansionist and a direct agency of imperialism". Labour politicians Ken Livingstone of the Greater London Council and Ted Knight of the Lambeth London Borough Council were early supporters; the chair was former British Anti-Zionist Organization (BAZO) activist Tony Greenstein. The new Committee backed a resolution at the 1982 Labour Party Conference to recognise the Palestine Liberation Organization (PLO) as the "sole legitimate representative of the Palestinian people", which passed at the Conference, "embarrassing" the Party leadership.

Antisemitic attitudes are said to have been rare in the Labour Party in the 1980s. In his 2012 book, The British Left and Zionism: History of a Divorce, Manchester University's Paul Kelemen ascribed the shift in Labour's views to Israel's increasingly right-leaning politics and to the left's opposition to the Israeli occupation of the West Bank and Gaza. He found no evidence that antisemitism played a role in the left's changing perceptions of the Israeli Palestinian conflict in that period. Daniel L. Staetsky, a senior research fellow for the Institute for Jewish Policy Research, stated in his 2017 study Antisemitism in Contemporary Great Britain: A Study of Attitudes Towards Jews and Israel that, in the 1980s, parts of the political left assumed strong pro-Palestinian and anti-Israel positions, and faced accusations of antisemitism within the Labour Party. He found that anti-Israeli positions did not correlate generally with antisemitism, since the majority of those surveyed who were critical of Israel did not espouse an antisemitic attitude and that antisemitism on the left was no higher than that of the general population.

Jewish voting intentions
In the 1980s, much of the Jewish population supported Margaret Thatcher, especially in her own seat of Finchley. Tony Blair and Gordon Brown were both patrons of the Jewish National Fund and members of Labour Friends of Israel and many Jewish voters returned to Labour in the late 1990s under New Labour, with polling generally showing Jews as evenly split between Labour and Conservatives, which remained the case in 2010, when Labour elected its first Jewish leader, Ed Miliband, who narrowly defeated his brother, David Miliband.

2000–2015

Tested election posters
In the run-up to the 2005 United Kingdom general election, the Labour Party, under Tony Blair, tested posters which TBWA, Labour's advertising agency, later said originated from Campaign Director Alastair Campbell. One depicted the faces of Conservative Party leader Michael Howard and Shadow Chancellor Oliver Letwin, who are Jewish, superimposed upon flying pigs. The slogan was "The Day Tory Sums Add Up" and the poster illustrated the adynaton, when pigs fly, used for something that will never happen. A second poster was of Howard swinging a pocket watch on its chain with the slogan "I can spend the same money twice!" somewhat suggestive of stage hypnosis, where the subject is persuaded to accept false suggestions as true. Conservative backbencher Ann Widdecombe had suggested Howard, whose father was born in Romania, had an image problem in that he had "something of the night about him". Labour strategists leapt at this by then depicting Howard as a Dracula figure swinging a hypnotic watch. The pose was said by The Jewish Chronicle to be reminiscent of fictional Jewish, criminal, characters, such as the moneylender, Shylock, from Shakespeare's The Merchant of Venice and the master pickpocket, Fagin, from Dickens' Oliver Twist. The posters were not used and Labour denied any antisemitic intent. They prompted protests from some Jewish groups but the Board of Deputies of British Jews declined to raise the issue.

Concern over Israel lobby
In 2003, Labour MP Tam Dalyell claimed, referring to the Israel lobby in the United States, that "there is far too much Jewish influence in the United States" and that "a cabal of Jewish advisers" was directing American and British policy on Iraq, stating that six of seven hawkish advisers to President George Bush were Jewish, close to Ariel Sharon's Likud, and also singling out Michael Levy, chief fundraiser for Tony Blair and his Middle East envoy for nine years. Eric Moonman stated he did not think Dalyell, a close associate of Richard Crossman, antisemitic, but that his language could be taken as supportive of that outlook.

In 2010, Labour MP Martin Linton said, in reference to the Israel lobby in the UK, "There are long tentacles of Israel in this country who are funding election campaigns and putting money into the British political system for their own ends," while his Jewish fellow Labour MP Gerald Kaufman said that right-wing Jewish millionaires had large stakes in the Conservative Party. Community Security Trust spokesman Mark Gardner responded: "Anybody who understands antisemitism will recognise just how ugly and objectionable these quotes are, with their imagery of Jewish control and money power." In 2015, Kaufman said that "Jewish money, Jewish donations to the Conservative Party ... [and] support from the Jewish Chronicle" had led to "a big group of Conservative MPs who are pro-Israel whatever (its) government does", referring to the Conservative Friends of Israel; Corbyn condemned Kaufman's remarks at the time as "completely unacceptable".

In 2010, Ed Miliband became Labour's first ever Jewish leader. In August 2014, Miliband was criticised by Jewish donors and supporters for describing Israel's ground incursion into Gaza in summer 2014 as "wrong and unjustifiable". Jewish support for Labour fell to 15% in the May 2015 general election, compared to 64% for the Conservatives.

Livingstone's comments
In 2005, Livingstone was accused of antisemitism after he asked Evening Standard reporter Oliver Finegold if he had been "a German war criminal". When the reporter said he was Jewish, Livingstone said he was "just like a concentration camp guard, you are just doing it because you are paid to, aren't you?" and asserted that he (Finegold) worked for the "reactionary bigots... who supported fascism" at the Daily Mail. The Evening Standard was then a sister paper of the Mail, which had been supportive of fascism in the 1930s.

Corbyn's backbench record
Jeremy Corbyn is a patron of the Palestinian Solidarity Campaign and had campaigned extensively for Palestinian rights during his 32 years as a backbencher. In August 2015, as  Corbyn emerged as a front-runner in the Labour Party leadership election, The Jewish Chronicle devoted its front page to seven questions regarding Corbyn's associations with those it described as "Holocaust deniers, terrorists and some outright antisemites", although Corbyn said he met with them in his search for peace in the Middle East. These included his relationship with Islamist militant organisations Hezbollah and Hamas, organisations that Corbyn called "friends" (although he has stated he disagrees with their views); and his failure to object to what The Jewish Chronicle described as antisemitic banners and posters that "dominate" the London Quds Day rallies supported by the organisation, Stop the War Coalition, of which Corbyn was national chair from 2011 to 2015. Two of the questions related to "Deir Yassin Remembered", an organisation commemorating the massacre of over 100 Palestinian villagers in 1948 and founded by Holocaust denier Paul Eisen. Up to 2013, Jeremy Corbyn and Jewish Labour MP Gerald Kaufman attended "two or three" of the group's annual events. Corbyn has said that this had taken place before Eisen had made his views known publicly, and that he would not have associated with him had he known. It was reported that Eisen's views were known in 2005 and that he had written an essay on his website in 2008 entitled "My life as a Holocaust denier".

Labour MP Diane Abbott defended Corbyn by calling his critics part of a "Westminster elite" afraid of Corbyn's anti-austerity agenda. 47 prominent Jewish activists, including Laurence Dreyfus, Selma James, Miriam Margolyes, Ilan Pappé, Michael Rosen and Avi Shlaim were signatories to a letter criticising The Jewish Chronicles reporting of Corbyn's association with alleged antisemites.

2016

Shah, Livingstone and Walker's comments
In April 2016, after it was revealed that Labour MP Naz Shah had, during the 2014 Israel–Gaza conflict and before she became an MP, shared a graphic of Israel superimposed on the U.S. with the caption "Solution for Israel-Palestine conflict – relocate Israel into United States", adding the comment, "Problem solved". She was suspended pending investigation, but reinstated after agreeing to apologise for bringing the party into disrepute. By May 2016, the Labour Party had suspended 56 members for statements alleged to be antisemitic, pending investigation; these comprised 0.4% of the parliamentary group, 0.07% of Labour councillors, and 0.012% of the Party membership. The graphic that Shah shared was created by American political scientist Norman Finkelstein, who described the controversy as "obscene". Referring to those on the right of the Labour Party allegedly using the scandal to undermine Corbyn, Finkelstein asked "What are they doing? Don't they have any respect for the dead? ... All these desiccated Labour apparatchiks, dragging the Nazi holocaust through the mud for the sake of their petty jostling for power and position. Have they no shame?"

Former London Mayor Ken Livingstone defended Shah and said he had never heard antisemitic comments from Labour members. Livingstone added: "When Hitler won his election in 1932 his policy then was that Jews should be moved to Israel. He was supporting Zionism before he went mad and ended up killing six million Jews." After being suspended for a year, a hearing in April 2017 by the National Constitutional Committee determined he was guilty of prejudicial and detrimental conduct and suspended him from standing for office or representing the party at any level for a further year. In May 2018, he resigned from the party, saying the issues surrounding his suspension had become a distraction. In a statement Livingstone said, "I do not accept the allegation that I have brought the Labour Party into disrepute – nor that I am in any way guilty of antisemitism. I abhor antisemitism, I have fought it all my life and will continue to do so."

In May 2016, the vice-chair of Momentum, Jackie Walker, was investigated by the party over private comments she made on Facebook exaggerating the role of Jews in the Atlantic slave trade. Walker said her words had been taken out of context and no further action was taken following the investigation. Jon Lansman, the chair of Momentum, defended her, describing the media as "a 'lynch mob' whose interest in combating racism is highly selective". Following that year's Party Conference, at which Walker asked in a training session why Holocaust Memorial Day did not include pre-1940 genocides such as the Atlantic slave trade, she was removed from her Momentum position, while remaining on its steering committee, after Manuel Cortes, the general secretary of the TSSA union, said their funding would be reconsidered otherwise. Lansman called Walker's comments "ill-informed, ill-judged and offensive", but not antisemitic. The party suspended her from membership, pending investigation. Walker said that she "utterly condemn[s] antisemitism", that her words were taken out of context, and that "I would never play down the significance of the Shoah. Working with many Jewish comrades, I continue to seek to bring greater awareness of other genocides, which are too often forgotten or minimised. If offence has been caused, it is the last thing I would want to do and I apologise." She was expelled from the party for misconduct in March 2019.

Inquiries into antisemitism
Following the suspensions, Corbyn commissioned an inquiry into antisemitism and other forms of racism in April 2016, led by Shami Chakrabarti, a barrister and the former head of the human rights advocacy group Liberty. She joined the Labour Party when appointed to, she said, show that she had members' interests and values at heart. The inquiry had two deputy chairs: Jan Royall, who was also investigating allegations of antisemitism at Oxford University Labour Club, and David Feldman, Director of the Pears Institute for the Study of Antisemitism. In 2007, Feldman was a signatory to Independent Jewish Voices, which in May 2016 described some allegations of antisemitism within Labour as "baseless and disingenuous", and Chakrabarti said he distanced himself from this comment.

In June, the inquiry reported that it had found "no evidence" of systemic antisemitism in Labour, though there was an "occasionally toxic atmosphere", and made 20 recommendations, including outlawing offensive terms and improving disciplinary procedures. Responses comprised both acceptance and criticism. Jeremy Newmark, chair of the Jewish Labour Movement, said: "It's a strong platform for the party to ... set a gold standard in tackling racism and anti-Semitism." John Mann MP, chair of the All Party Parliamentary Group on Antisemitism, called it "hugely significant". The Jewish Leadership Council and Community Security Trust jointly welcomed aspects of it. The Board of Deputies of British Jews said: "We hope that the implementation of this report will be rigorous and swift." Chief Rabbi Ephraim Mirvis also called for a "full and unhesitating implementation of the report's findings".

Chakrabarti was Labour's sole nomination to the House of Lords in David Cameron's August 2016 Resignation Honours. She became a peer in September and the following month was appointed Shadow Attorney General. Commentators were immediately more critical, with the report being described as a "whitewash for peerage scandal" by the Board of Deputies of British Jews while British author Howard Jacobson called the inquiry "a brief and shoddy shuffling of superficies" that "spoke to very few of the people charging the party with anti-Semitism and understood even fewer of their arguments", and suggested that the peerage was showing contempt for those who had raised issues over antisemitism in the party.

In April 2018, Chakrabarti accepted that some recommendations had not been implemented and said that the new Labour Party General Secretary, Jennie Formby, would make this a priority.

Following allegations of antisemitism within the Oxford University Labour Club, an inquiry was launched by Labour Students, chaired by Jan Royall. The party's National Executive Committee accepted the report in May 2016. The report found that there was "no evidence the club is itself institutionally anti-Semitic", though there was a "cultural problem" in which (antisemitic) "behaviour and language that would once have been intolerable is now tolerated".

In October, the House of Commons Home Affairs Select Committee held an inquiry into antisemitism in the United Kingdom. The committee found "no reliable, empirical evidence to support the notion that there is a higher prevalence of antisemitic attitudes within the Labour Party than any other party." It was critical of Corbyn's response to antisemitic incidents against Labour MPs and described the Chakrabarti inquiry as "ultimately compromised". The report also found that "the failure of the Labour Party to deal consistently and effectively with anti-Semitic incidents in recent years risks lending force to allegations that elements of the Labour movement are institutionally anti-Semitic".

Muslim prejudice
In May 2016, Baroness Ruth Deech said that "Too many Labour politicians cravenly adopted the anti-Semitic tropes and anti-Israel demonization they think will get them British Muslim votes, rather than standing up to the prejudice that exists in the community". In the same month, Dr. Manfred Gerstenfeld said that, while not all of the most extreme antisemitic slurs were made by Muslim representatives of Labour, they represent a disproportionately large proportion of antisemitic perpetrators. According to Gerstenfeld, Labour's issue with antisemitism "demonstrate what happens when a party bends over backward to attract Muslim voters".

2017

Jewish constituencies in the general election
During the 2017 general election campaign, Jeremy Newmark, the chairman of the Jewish Labour Movement, said that "Jeremy Corbyn appears to have failed to understand the nature of contemporary anti-Semitism in the same way that it's understood by most of its target group". Labour MP Wes Streeting criticised the party's record on antisemitism, saying "I don't think many Jewish voters in my constituency have been very impressed with the way the Labour Party as a whole have responded", but denied that Corbyn was antisemitic.  According to polling in 2015, politicians' attitudes towards Israel influence the vote of three out of four British Jews.

It is estimated that 26% of Jewish voters voted for Labour. Analysis by election analysts Prof Stephen Fisher, Prof Rob Ford, Prof Sir John Curtice and Patrick English based on The British General Election of 2017 by Philip Cowley and Dennis Kavanagh suggests that, in the five UK constituencies where, according to the 2011 Census, more than 10% of the population identify as Jewish: Finchley and Golders Green (21.1%), Hendon (17.0%), Hertsmere (14.3%), Hackney North and Stoke Newington (11.3%) and Bury South (10.2%), Labour's vote share at the 2017 general election increased by seven share points on average, almost three points less than the national average. This includes an above-average swing to Labour in Hackney North and Stoke Newington.

Hate speech made a disciplinary offence
During the 2017 Labour Party Conference, new rules proposed by the Jewish Labour Movement and supported by Jeremy Corbyn were adopted on hate speech. Previously, party members could not be disciplined for "the mere holding or expression of beliefs and opinions". Under the new rules, those who express antisemitic or other forms of hate speech, including racism, Islamophobia, sexism and homophobia, or other "conduct prejudicial to the Party", can be disciplined.

Authors' public letter
In November 2017, Jewish authors Howard Jacobson, Simon Schama, and Simon Sebag Montefiore in a letter to The Times, said "We are alarmed that during the past few years, constructive criticism of Israeli governments has morphed into something closer to antisemitism under the cloak of so-called anti-Zionism", further stating "Although anti-Zionists claim innocence of any antisemitic intent, anti-Zionism frequently borrows the libels of classical Jew-hating," and adding "Accusations of international Jewish conspiracy and control of the media have resurfaced to support false equations of Zionism with colonialism and imperialism, and the promotion of vicious, fictitious parallels with genocide and Nazism".

2018

Corbyn's backbench record
Jeremy Corbyn's defenders have cited his record of opposing and campaigning against racism and antisemitism, and supporting Jewish communal initiatives. He organised a demonstration against a 1970s National Front march through Wood Green; spoke on the 80th anniversary of the Battle of Cable Street, noting that his mother was a protester; signed numerous Early Day Motions condemning antisemitism; in 1987, campaigned to reverse Islington Council's decision to grant the planning application to destroy a Jewish cemetery; and in 2010, called on the UK government to facilitate the settlement of Yemeni Jews in Britain. He also took part in a ceremony in his Islington constituency to commemorate the original site of the North London Synagogue and visited the Theresienstadt Ghetto, calling it a reminder of the dangers of far-right politics, antisemitism and racism. His defenders have criticised the tactics of opponents and the role of the media. The following actions by Corbyn when he was a backbencher were the subject of criticism.

Talk by Hajo Meyer
In January 2010, during the UK's Holocaust Memorial week, Labour MP Jeremy Corbyn co-chaired a meeting in the House of Commons, with the main talk by anti-Zionist Auschwitz survivor Hajo Meyer entitled, "The Misuse of the Holocaust for Political Purposes", where Israel was compared to the Nazis. Meyer said "Judaism in Israel has been substituted by the Holocaust religion, whose high priest is Elie Wiesel." In August 2018, Louise Ellman MP told the BBC that she was "absolutely appalled" at Corbyn for chairing Meyer's talk. When asked about his involvement with the meeting, Corbyn said that "Views were expressed at the meeting which I do not accept or condone. In the past, in pursuit of justice for the Palestinian people and peace in Israel/Palestine, I have on occasion appeared on platforms with people whose views I completely reject. I apologise for the concerns and anxiety that this has caused".

Renaming of Holocaust Memorial Day
In January 2011, a motion was submitted to rename Holocaust Memorial Day to "Genocide Memorial Day", supported by 23 MPs, mainly from the Labour Party and including Corbyn. Karen Pollock, chief executive of the Holocaust Educational Trust said in 2018 that "Holocaust Memorial Day already rightly includes all victims of the Nazis and subsequent genocides, but the Holocaust was a specific crime, with anti-Semitism at its core. Any attempt to remove that specificity is a form of denial and distortion." Labour responded by saying that "this was a cross-party initiative, jointly sponsored by a senior Conservative MP, to emphasize the already broader character of Holocaust Memorial Day. It is not our policy to seek a name change for this important commemoration".

John A. Hobson's foreword
In 2011, Corbyn wrote the foreword for a republication of the 1902 book Imperialism: A Study, by John A. Hobson, which contains the assertion that finance was controlled "by men of a single and peculiar race, who have behind them many centuries of financial experience" who "are in a unique position to control the policy of nations". In his foreword, Corbyn called the book a "great tome" and "brilliant, and very controversial at the time". Corbyn was criticised for his words in 2019, after his foreword was reported by Conservative peer Daniel Finkelstein in The Times. Corbyn responded that the language used to describe minorities in Hobson's work is "absolutely deplorable", but asserted that his foreword analysed "the process which led to the first world war" which he saw as the subject of the book and not Hobson's language.

Hobson was also cited and praised by previous Labour leaders. In 2005, Gordon Brown said in a Chatham House speech: "This idea of liberty as empowerment is not a new idea, J. A. Hobson asked, 'is a man free who has not equal opportunity with his fellows of such access to all material and moral means of personal development and work as shall contribute to his own welfare and that of his society?'" Tony Blair described Hobson as "probably the most famous Liberal convert to what was then literally 'new Labour'."

Response to mural

The 2012 Freedom for Humanity was a street mural painted in east London by American artist Mear One. The artwork depicted what Mear One described as an "elite banker cartel" of the Rothschilds, the Rockefellers, the Morgans and others sitting around a Monopoly-style board game on the backs of men with dark complexions. The temporary mural was later removed prematurely by Tower Hamlets council following complaints by residents. Lutfur Rahman, then Mayor of Tower Hamlets, said "the images of the bankers perpetuate antisemitic propaganda about conspiratorial Jewish domination of financial and political institutions". In response, Mear One denied that the mural was antisemitic; he said that the mural was about "class and privilege", and pointed out that the figures depicted included both "Jewish and white Anglos".

Corbyn, responding to a Facebook post from the artist, which contained an image of the mural and was written before it had been criticised in the media, saying, "Tomorrow they want to buff my mural Freedom of Expression," had written: "Why? You are in good company. Rockerfeller(sic) destroyed Diego Viera's [sic] mural because it includes a picture of Lenin," an apparent reference to Nelson Rockefeller's destruction of Diego Rivera's Man at the Crossroads fresco in 1934.

In March 2018, Labour MP Luciana Berger asked Corbyn why he had questioned the removal of a mural showing a member of the Rothschild family as it did. Corbyn's spokesman issued a statement later in the day: "Jeremy was responding to concerns about the removal of public art on grounds of freedom of speech. The mural was offensive, used antisemitic imagery, which has no place in our society, and it is right that it was removed". Berger said the response was "wholly inadequate". In his own statement, Corbyn said: "I sincerely regret that I did not look more closely at the image I was commenting on, the contents of which are deeply disturbing and antisemitic," he said. "The defence of free speech cannot be used as a justification for the promotion of antisemitism in any form. That is a view I've always held." Karen Pollock of the Holocaust Educational Trust said that the mural was "indefensible" as it "was blatantly anti-Semitic, using images commonly found in anti-Semitic propaganda – it is impossible not to notice". Jeremy Gilbert, professor of cultural and political theory at the University of East London argued that this accusation is based on a logical fallacy, saying that the allegation "amounts to a mere argument from resemblance: because anti-capitalist discourse and anti-Semitic discourse share some structural features, they are fundamentally the same". For example, both anti-capitalist discourse and antisemitic discourse are often conspiratorial in nature; but similarity does not denote the same motive or intent. According to historian Deborah E. Lipstadt, as well as contemporary local media, the Jewish caricatures resembled the imagery used by Der Stürmer in Nazi Germany.

Comments about certain Zionists
In a January 2013 meeting in Parliament, the UK Palestinian Authority representative Manuel Hassassian said that Jews are "the only children of God ... because nobody is stopping Israel building its messianic dream of Eretz Israel [the Land of Israel]". Pro-Israel activists at the meeting then challenged Hassassian. In August 2018, MailOnline released footage of comments that Corbyn had made a few days after this event at Friends House in Euston, convened by the Palestinian Return Centre. There, he defended the earlier comments made by Hassassian on the history of Palestine, which, he said, were "dutifully recorded by the thankfully silent Zionists" in the audience. Corbyn went on to say that these "Zionists" had approached Hassassian and "berated him afterwards for what he had said", and that these "Zionists" had "two problems": "One is that they don't want to study history and secondly, having lived in this country for a very long time, probably all their lives, they don't understand English irony either. Manuel [Hassassian] does understand English irony and uses it very, very effectively so I think they need two lessons which we can help them with".

His comments were accused by some of being coded antisemitism, including by Labour MPs Luciana Berger, Wes Streeting, Mike Gapes, Catherine McKinnell, and political strategist John McTernan. A number of Conservative MPs reported Corbyn to the parliamentary standards watchdog over the comments. Historian Deborah Lipstadt, writing in The Atlantic, asserted that Corbyn had crossed the line from anti-Zionism to antisemitism. Corbyn's remarks were defended by shadow chancellor John McDonnell, who argued that the comments were "taken out of context". A Labour spokesperson said that parts of the speech which contexualised Corbyn's language were "edited out of the footage ... He had been speaking about Zionists and non-Zionist Jews and very clearly does not go on to use Zionists as any kind of shorthand for Jews".

Corbyn's membership of Facebook groups
In March 2018, it was reported that, in 2014, Corbyn and some of his staff had been members of three private Facebook groups, including "Palestine Live" and "History of Palestine", containing antisemitic posts. A spokesman said that Corbyn had been added to the first two groups by others, had little involvement in them, and had either left them already or left following the reports. The Labour Party stated that a full investigation would be undertaken and action taken against any member involved.

Facebook groups
At the beginning of April 2018, The Sunday Times reported that it had uncovered over 2,000 examples of antisemitic, racist, violent threats and abusive posts in Corbyn-supporting private Facebook groups, including frequent attacks on Jews and Holocaust denying material. The 20 largest pro-Corbyn private Facebook groups, which have a combined membership of over 400,000, were reported to have as members 12 senior staff who work for Corbyn and shadow chancellor John McDonnell. Many of the posts criticised Labour MP Luciana Berger and Jonathan Arkush, president of the Board of Deputies of British Jews. A Labour Party spokesperson said the groups "are not officially connected to the party in any way". Labour MPs urged Corbyn to instruct his supporters to shut down groups containing abusive posts. Subsequently, Corbyn deleted his own personal Facebook account that he had set up before becoming Labour leader, although his official page remained.

Christine Shawcroft resignation
In March 2018, Christine Shawcroft, the recently appointed head of the Party's disputes panel, resigned after it emerged she had opposed the suspension of Peterborough council candidate Alan Bull, for what she called "a Facebook post taken completely out of context and alleged to show anti-Semitism". She later said that she had not seen the "abhorrent" Facebook post in question. Bull, in 2015, had shared in a closed Facebook group an article suggesting that the Holocaust was a hoax to "invite discussion and debate". Bull later said "I'm not an anti-Semite, I am not a holocaust denier – I support equal rights for Palestinian people".

Relationship with the Jewish community
In March 2018, the Board of Deputies of British Jews and the Jewish Leadership Council issued an open letter stating that Corbyn was "repeatedly found alongside people with blatantly anti-Semitic views", concluding that Corbyn "cannot seriously contemplate anti-Semitism, because he is so ideologically fixed within a far-left worldview that is instinctively hostile to mainstream Jewish communities". Following the open letter's publication accusing Corbyn of siding with antisemites "again and again", hundreds of people outside Parliament Square gathered to protest 'Enough is Enough' against antisemitism in the Labour Party, demanding that Corbyn do more to tackle anti-Jewish feeling in Labour Party ranks. Jewish Voice for Labour organised a smaller counter-demonstration. A Jewish Voice for Labour spokesman said after the event: "There is a massive difference between saying that more needs to be done within the party and a demonstration like this which is implicitly trying to force him [Corbyn] out ... This protest is unnecessary, inflammatory and politicised." The organisation said in a statement that it was "appalled" by the Board of Deputies' letter. "They do not represent us or the great majority of Jews in the party who share Jeremy Corbyn's vision for social justice and fairness. Jeremy's consistent commitment to anti-racism is all the more needed now." Jewish Voice for Labour's Chair Jenny Manson defended Corbyn on Daily Politics, saying he had taken "enormously strong action" to deal with the issue in his party.

In April 2018, Corbyn attended a "third night" Passover Seder celebration held in his constituency by the radical Jewish group Jewdas. Corbyn was criticised for attending the event by the Jewish Leadership Council, while the Board of Deputies of British Jews said: "If Jeremy Corbyn goes to their event, how can we take his stated commitment to be an ally against anti-Semitism seriously?" Charlotte Nichols, Young Labour's women's officer and a member of Jewdas, commended Corbyn for attending the event, arguing that it was "absolutely right" for Corbyn to "engage with the community at all levels" and that many of the event attendees "are absolutely part of the 'mainstream community'".

In April 2018, following a meeting with Corbyn to discuss antisemitism in the Labour Party, the Jewish Leadership Council and the Board of Deputies said "We are disappointed that Mr Corbyn's proposals fell short of the minimum level of action which our letter suggested. In particular, they did not agree in the meeting with our proposals that there should be a fixed timetable to deal with antisemitism cases; that they should expedite the long-standing cases involving Ken Livingstone and Jackie Walker; that no MP should share a platform with somebody expelled or suspended for antisemitism; that they adopt the full International Holocaust Remembrance Alliance definition of antisemitism with all its examples and clauses; that there should be transparent oversight of their disciplinary process". Corbyn described the meeting as "positive and constructive" and re-iterated that he was "absolutely committed" to rooting out antisemitism in the Labour Party.

In April 2018, the Israeli Labor Party, the sister party of the Jewish Labour Movement, led by Avi Gabbay announced it would cut ties with Corbyn and his office due to their handling of antisemitism, but still retain ties with the UK Labour Party as a whole. In a letter to Corbyn, Gabbay wrote of "my responsibility to acknowledge the hostility that you have shown to the Jewish community and the antisemitic statements and actions you have allowed".

In September 2018, Femke van Zijst, spokesperson of the Labour Party of the Netherlands, declared that her party found "recent reports worrisome" about Corbyn and the growth of anti-semitism in the Labour Party of the United Kingdom.

In November 2018, Marie van der Zyl, president of the Board of Deputies of British Jews, said "Over the summer, we showed how we could keep this issue of antisemitism on the front pages day after day, week after week, exacting a severe political and reputational cost for continued failure."

Working definition of antisemitism

Criticism
In December 2016, Labour adopted the International Holocaust Remembrance Alliance (IHRA) Working Definition of Antisemitism. In May 2017, Stephen Sedley said: "Anti-Semitism, where it manifests itself in discriminatory acts or inflammatory speech, is generally illegal. Criticism of Israel or of Zionism is protected by law. The IHRA working definition conflates the two by characterising everything other than anodyne criticism of Israel as anti-Semitic". Labour formally adopted the definition at its September 2017 Conference. Jewish Voice for Labour's Jonathan Rosenhead described it as intentionally "vague", allowing for "the protection of Israel" via "a side door" and thus "encouraging the presumption that criticism of Israel is likely to be antisemitic". The organisation saw the change as an "anti-democratic restriction on political debate", and offered their own definition.

In July 2018, 39 left-wing Jewish organisations in 15 countries, including six in the UK, declared that the definition was "worded in such a way as to be easily adopted or considered by western governments to intentionally equate legitimate criticisms of Israel and advocacy for Palestinian rights with antisemitism, as a means to suppress the former" and that "this conflation undermines both the Palestinian struggle for freedom, justice and equality and the global struggle against antisemitism. It also serves to shield Israel from being held accountable to universal standards of human rights and international law". Writer and scholar of antisemitism Antony Lerman said "Jewish leaders claim exclusive rights to determine what is antisemitism, potentially putting Jewish sentiment above the law of the land. The fundamental principle that IHRA is so flawed it should be abandoned, not tinkered with. The answer to hate speech is more speech, not suppression of offensive views".

Revision
In July 2018, Labour's National Executive Committee (NEC) adopted a new code of conduct defining antisemitism for disciplinary purposes, intended to make the process more efficient and transparent. It included the IHRA definition, but amended or omitted four of the eleven examples, all relating to Israel, and added three others.  "Accusing Jewish citizens of being more loyal to Israel, or to the alleged priorities of Jews worldwide, than to the interests of their own nations", is described as wrong, rather than antisemitic. "Comparisons of contemporary Israeli policy to that of the Nazis" is only to be regarded as antisemitic if there is evidence of antisemitic intent. The omitted examples were "the existence of a State of Israel is a racist endeavor" and "Requiring higher standards of behaviour from Israel than other nations".

Jennie Formby, the general secretary, said the code supplements the definition "with additional examples and guidance", creating "the most thorough and expansive Code of Conduct on anti-Semitism introduced by any political party in the UK". NEC member Jon Lansman said "Clear and detailed guidelines are essential to ensure that antisemitism isn't tolerated, while protecting free speech on Israel's conduct, within a respectful and civil environment. This is what Labour's code of conduct provides."

Response
The Board of Deputies of British Jews and the Jewish Leadership Council said that the new rules "only dilute the definition and further erode the existing lack of confidence that British Jews have in their sincerity to tackle anti-Semitism within the Labour movement". Margaret Hodge MP called Corbyn a "fucking anti-Semite and a racist." Law lecturer Tom Frost said the code ignored the Macpherson Principle that "A racist incident is any incident which is perceived to be racist by the victim or any other person." On 16 July, over 60 British rabbis, including Harvey Belovski, Laura Janner-Klausner, Danny Rich and Jonathan Wittenberg said that Labour had "chosen to ignore the Jewish community", that it was "not the Labour party's place to rewrite a definition of antisemitism", and that the full definition had been accepted by the Crown Prosecution Service, the Scottish parliament, the Welsh assembly and 124 local authorities. Later in July, in an unprecedented move, three UK Jewish newspapers, The Jewish Chronicle, Jewish News and Jewish Telegraph, carried a joint editorial saying that a Corbyn government would be an "existential threat to Jewish life" in the UK which, according to David Patrikarakos, was the most drastic step taken by the Anglo-Jewish community since Oliver Cromwell allowed Jews back into the country in the 1650s. The former chief rabbi Lord Jonathan Sacks in turn stated that Labour's antisemitism was causing British Jews to consider leaving the country. The newspapers also stated that "Had the full IHRA definition with examples relating to Israel been approved, hundreds, if not thousands, of Labour and Momentum members would need to be expelled." A Labour spokesman said the party posed "no threat of any kind whatsoever to Jewish people".

Defence
Human rights solicitor Geoffrey Bindman said that "The new code of conduct on antisemitism seeks to establish that antisemitism cannot be used as a pretext for censorship without evidence of antisemitic intent in line with the view of the all-party Commons home affairs select committee in October 2016 that the IHRA definition should only be adopted if qualified by caveats making clear that it is not antisemitic to criticise the Israeli government without additional evidence to suggest antisemitic intent… Far from watering down or weakening it, Labour's code strengthens it by addressing forms of discrimination that the IHRA overlooked." Geoffrey Robertson QC made a similar point. Philosopher and scholar of antisemitism Brian Klug said "The IHRA code is a living document, subject to revision and constantly needing to be adapted to the different contexts in which people apply its definition. This is the spirit in which the drafters of Labour's code have approached their task." In Historian Geoffrey Alderman wrote: "This Labour Party row will not be settled by relying on a flawed and faulty definition of antisemitism."

Outcome and media review
In September 2018, all 11 examples were accepted by the NEC, while Jeremy Corbyn said that they would not prevent criticism of the Israeli government or advocating Palestinian rights. Also in September 2018, the Media Reform Coalition examined over 250 articles and broadcast news segments covering the issue, and found over 90 examples of misleading or inaccurate reporting. The research found evidence of "overwhelming source imbalance", in which Labour's critics dominated coverage which failed to include those defending the code or critiquing the IHRA definition, and omitted contextual facts about the IHRA definition, concluding these were "systematic reporting failures" disadvantaging the Labour leadership.

Corbyn's responses
In March 2018, in response to claims that he may be seen as antisemitic, Corbyn stated, "I'm not an anti-Semite in any form" and that he challenges "anti-Semitism whenever it arises and no anti-Semitic remarks are done in my name or would ever be done in my name". In the same month, Corbyn also said that he would not tolerate antisemitism "in and around" Labour. "We must stamp this out from our party and movement", he said. "We recognise that anti-Semitism has occurred in pockets within the Labour Party, causing pain and hurt to our Jewish community in the Labour Party and the rest of the country. I am sincerely sorry for the pain which has been caused, and pledge to redouble my efforts to bring this anxiety to an end". The following month, writing in the Evening Standard, Corbyn said, "We have not done enough fully to get to grips with the problem, and for that the Jewish community and our own Jewish members deserve an apology. My party and I are sorry for the hurt and distress caused".

In August 2018, he said that antisemitism was a "problem that Labour is working to overcome". He said that some criticism of Israel may stray into antisemitism at times, but denied that all forms of anti-Zionism were inherently racist, and pledged to "root out antisemitism" within the party, saying: "People who dish out anti-Semitic poison need to understand: You do not do it in my name. You are not my supporters and have no place in our movement." In a video release a few days later, Corbyn apologised again, saying, "I acknowledge there is a real problem of antisemitism that Labour is working to overcome. I am sorry for the hurt that has been caused to many Jewish people". In the same month, Corbyn said that the notion that he or Labour posed an "existential threat" to British Jews was "overheated rhetoric", but agreed that factions of the Labour Party had issues with antisemitism and that there was work to be done for Labour to regain the trust of British Jews.

In September 2018, at the Labour Party Conference, Corbyn said he wants Labour and the Jewish community to "work together and draw a line" under antisemitism. He went on to attack the record of the Conservative Party for accusing Labour of "anti-Semitism one day, then endorse Viktor Orbán's hard-right government the next day".

In February 2019, Corbyn reiterated, "As leader ... I wish to set out my own commitment along with that of the wider shadow cabinet as the leaders of the Labour Party in parliament to root out antisemitism. I am determined we will defeat racism wherever we see it and I know that antisemitism is one of the oldest, nastiest and most persistent forms of racism." A week later, he said in Parliament, "(Antisemitism has) no place whatsoever in any of our political parties, in our lives, in our society".

In July 2019, Corbyn said "While other political parties and some of the media exaggerate and distort the scale of the problem in our party, we must face up to the unsettling truth that a small number of Labour members hold anti-Semitic views and a larger number don't recognise anti-Semitic stereotypes and conspiracy theories. The evidence is clear enough. The worst cases of anti-Semitism in our party have included Holocaust denial, crude Jewish-banker stereotypes, conspiracy theories blaming Israel for 9/11 or every war on the Rothschild family, and even one member who appeared to believe that Hitler had been misunderstood. I am sorry for the hurt that has been caused to many Jewish people. We have been too slow in processing disciplinary cases of mostly online anti-Semitic abuse by party members. We are acting to speed this process up. People who hold anti-Semitic views have no place in the Labour Party. They may be few – the number of cases over the past three years represents less than 0.1% of Labour's membership of more than half a million – but one is too many."

In October 2019, a Labour spokesperson said "Jeremy Corbyn and the Labour Party are fully committed to the support, defence and celebration of the Jewish community and continue to take robust action to root out antisemitism in the party and wider society."

During the 2019 general election, Corbyn apologised on ITV's This Morning programme. A few days before, other members of the shadow cabinet, including Nia Griffith, Richard Burgon and John McDonnell, apologised for antisemitism in their party.

In June 2020, Corbyn said claims he tolerated antisemitism among his supporters were "wrong and extremely unfair" and that he had taken steps to create a "robust process" to deal with the claims, describing antisemitism as "absolutely, totally unacceptable in any form".

2019

Training and education
In 2018, the Jewish Labour Movement was invited to provide antisemitism awareness training to those subject to disciplinary proceedings but declined as they did not believe training was an appropriate sanction.

In July 2018, Jewish Voice for Labour asked its members for help in delivering an "expanded programme" of antisemitism training to party members in response to what it called a "growing number of requests".

In March 2019, the Labour Party, referencing the volunteer-led nature of existing antisemitism training, announced that a short course in antisemitism would be developed by the Pears Institute for the Study of Antisemitism and that Jewish communal organisations would be consulted. The intention would be to enrol staff, NCC and NEC members on the course. The Jewish Labour Movement, which had provided volunteer-led training for the past three years, then withdrew its training provision for branches.

In June 2019, Labour peer Peter Hain and former Israeli negotiator in peace talks Daniel Levy argued that "actually the problem is political, and therefore requires a political not simply a procedural solution". In July 2019, Labour MP Clive Lewis in an article in The Independent wrote that: "Expulsions alone will not solve Labour's antisemitism crisis. Political education about antisemitism can help to ensure a socialist politics based on real equality becomes the common sense across the party."

In July 2019, Labour appointed Heather Mendick as a liaison officer to improve the party's relationships with the Jewish community. Jewish Leadership Council Chair Jonathan Goldstein expressed objections to the appointment and said that the JLC will not be engaging with Mendick.

Later in July 2019, Labour issued an online leaflet entitled "No Place For Antisemitism" alongside related documents and videos, as the launch of a programme of educating members on oppression and social liberation, and to help them confront racism and bigotry. This was promoted to all party members by an email from Jeremy Corbyn.

Disciplinary processes, outcomes and staff claims

Disciplinary processes
In April 2018, the new Labour General Secretary, Jennie Formby, announced that a team of lawyers had been seconded to handle disciplinary cases and that a new post of in-house general counsel had been advertised "to advise on disciplinary matters and improvements to our processes".

In September 2018, the NEC approved a doubling of the size of the party's key disciplinary body, the National Constitutional Committee, in order to speed up the handling of antisemitism claims.

In February 2019, Formby noted that the Governance and Legal Unit had suffered during 2018 from a high level of staff sickness and departures, which was addressed in part by secondments. She also said that the unit was now back to full strength and that the size of the unit will be more than doubled.

Later in the month, Lord Falconer accepted an invitation to examine Labour's processes in order to increase transparency though this did not take place due to the announcement of the Equality and Human Rights Commission's investigation. Formby asked that a request by Deputy Leader of the Labour Party Tom Watson to Labour parliamentarians, asking that complaints about antisemitism be copied to him for monitoring, be disregarded on the grounds that this would disrupt the official process and be in breach of data protection law.

In May 2019, Labour National Executive Committee member Jon Lansman wrote that leaked emails "...suggest that former compliance unit officials from the Labour right may have delayed action on some of the most extreme and high-profile antisemitism cases, including Holocaust denial, allowing a backlog of cases to build up that would damage the party and Jeremy's leadership." He also accused former General Secretary Iain McNicol and his team of delaying action on handling antisemitism cases, and allowing a backlog of cases to build up that would damage the party and Jeremy Corbyn's leadership.

In July 2019, a Labour spokesperson said that the rate at which antisemitism cases have been dealt with had increased fourfold after Formby took up her position in May 2018. In August 2019, Jewish Voice for Labour said that Labour's processes had greatly improved since April 2018.

Later in the month, the NEC agreed to speed up determination of the most serious cases by giving a special panel comprising the General Secretary and NEC officers the authority to consider these cases and expel members where appropriate, rather than requiring the cases to be referred to the quasi-judicial National Constitutional Committee. The rule change will be submitted for approval to the Labour Party Conference in September.

In June 2020, following the election as leader of Keir Starmer, it was reported that "a trusted ally of the Labour leader" had been appointed as a "management enforcer" to oversee the management of allegations of antisemitism. According to a party source, "For anyone seeking to stay in their jobs it would not be sensible to disobey the new manager's requests. The manager has also been given the power to step in and make decisions himself about cases."

Disciplinary outcomes
In February 2019, Formby announced to Labour MPs that, of the complaints about antisemitism received by the party from April 2018 to January 2019, 400 related to individuals who were not party members. In a further 220 cases, Labour had found that there was insufficient evidence of a breach of party rules. Some of the remaining 453 complaints, i.e. those where there was sufficient evidence of a breach of party rules, related to social media posts dating back a number of years. These 453 complaints received over the ten month period represented 0.06% of Labour's 540,000 membership. Investigations had resulted in 12 expulsions and 49 resignations from the party and 187 formal warnings, while some complaints received recently were still under investigation. Some Labour MPs questioned the accuracy of the data.

In July 2019, Formby provided updated disciplinary figures regarding complaints of antisemitism and committed to regularly publishing statistics. During the first six months of 2019, 625 complaints about members had been received, some members being the subject of multiple complaints, and 116 members suspended. A further 658 complaints were received about people who were not members. Of the complaints received relating to members, Labour decided that 100 lacked sufficient evidence and 163 showed no rule breaches, 90 received formal warnings or reminders of conduct and 97 had been referred to the National Constitutional Committee, which has the power to expel members. 146 cases were still being processed. National Executive Committee Antisemitism Panels had met six times and made 190 decisions, compared with two and eight in the same period the previous year. The National Constitutional Committee had concluded 28 cases and made eight expulsions with another twelve members resigning, compared with ten, seven and three in the same period the previous year.

In January 2020, the Labour Party reported that 149 members resigned or were expelled during 2019 as a result of disciplinary processes relating to antisemitism. Of these, 45 members were expelled, compared to ten in 2018 and one in 2017. NEC disciplinary panels heard 274 cases, compared with 28 cases in 2017. 296 members were suspended, compared to 98 in 2018, itself a big increase on the previous year. After the September 2019 annual conference gave NEC panels the power to expel, twice the number of people were expelled in two months than had been expelled during the whole of 2018.

Claims by former staff
In April 2019, the Party's lawyers wrote to its former head of disputes asking what information he had shared with the media and for his commitment not to commit further breaches of his non-disclosure agreement. In July, an edition of the BBC programme Panorama entitled "Is Labour Anti-Semitic?" produced by John Ware, included a claim by former staff that, in the first half of 2018, senior Labour figures had interfered in the complaints process while new senior officials in their department downgraded outcomes for antisemitic behaviour. Labour denied that there was interference and said the former staff included those who had "personal and political axes to grind". The Party added "The Panorama programme was not a fair or balanced investigation. It was a seriously inaccurate, politically one-sided polemic, which breached basic journalistic standards, invented quotes and edited emails to change their meaning." The BBC responded that "the investigation was not pre-determined, it was driven by the evidence". Labour later submitted a formal complaint about the programme to the BBC. Staff members represented by the GMB trade union voted overwhelmingly to call on the Party to be consistent in supporting whistle-blowers wherever they worked and to apologise to their former colleagues.

Resignations of MPs and peers
In August 2018, Labour MP Frank Field resigned the Labour whip over a "culture...of nastiness". He retained his party membership, announcing that he would sit as an "independent Labour MP". It was suggested by Owen Jones that the resignation had little to do with antisemitism, whilst Andrew Grice (a columnist for The Independent) and others have suggested that Field left before he was deselected by his local party, as he had lost a vote of confidence in his constituency over his support for Theresa May's Brexit plans in a recent parliamentary vote.

In February 2019, seven MPs quit Labour to form The Independent Group (latterly Change UK), citing their dissatisfaction with the party's leftward political direction, its approach to Brexit and to allegations of antisemitism. They were later joined by four more MPs, including three from the Conservative Party. Another MP resigned from Labour to sit as an independent. One of the original seven, Luciana Berger, said that Labour had become "sickeningly institutionally racist". Two days later, Corbyn said in Parliament, in response, "(Antisemitism has) no place whatsoever in any of our political parties, in our lives, in our society". Four of the MPs had recently lost votes of no-confidence brought by their constituency parties, while two such motions against Berger had recently been withdrawn. Following its failure to secure any seats in May 2019 European Parliament election, six of its MPs resigned to sit as independents.

In July 2019, three members of the House of Lords, David Triesman, Leslie Arnold Turnberg and Ara Darzi resigned the Labour whip to sit as independents, citing dissatisfaction with the party's handling of antisemitism, Brexit and defence policy.

In October 2019, Louise Ellman MP resigned from the party, citing her worries about antisemitism in the party and opposition to the prospect of a government led by Corbyn. Labour responded that "Jeremy Corbyn and the Labour Party are fully committed to the support, defence and celebration of the Jewish community and continue to take robust action to root out antisemitism in the party and wider society." Motions of no confidence in Ellman had recently been submitted for discussion in three branches of her constituency Labour Party. Riverside constituency Labour party said: "[S]he made it very clear at the last CLP meeting that she could not support a Jeremy Corbyn-led government. This inevitably meant that Louise would be triggered and was very unlikely to win any reselection process."

External investigations
In November 2018, the Metropolitan Police Commissioner Cressida Dick announced that they had been passed an internal Labour dossier detailing 45 allegations of antisemitic hate crimes committed by Labour Party members and would review them with a view to investigation.

In May 2019, following complaints submitted by the Jewish Labour Movement and the Campaign Against Antisemitism, the Equality and Human Rights Commission (EHRC) launched a formal investigation into whether Labour had "unlawfully discriminated against, harassed or victimised people because they are Jewish": specifically, whether "unlawful acts have been committed by the party and/or its employees and/or its agents, and; whether the party has responded to complaints of unlawful acts in a lawful, efficient and effective manner." In 2016, Labour MP Harriet Harman had expressed concern about the suitability of its chair, David Isaac, given his principal role as an equity partner at a City law firm that advises the Conservative government, Pinsent Masons. Previously, in September 2017, the EHRC Chief Executive, Rebecca Hilsenrath, had demanded a zero tolerance approach to antisemitism in the Labour Party and swift action by the leadership to deal with it. Antony Lerman, former founding director of the Institute for Jewish Policy Research, raised concerns that such a statement made Hilsenrath unsuitable to lead a probe into Labour. He wrote in openDemocracy: "Prior to investigation, is it not worrying that the CEO already claims to know what the Labour Party needs to do?" Hilsenrath later recused herself from the decision to investigate the Labour Party as her status as "an active member of the Anglo-Jewish community" could cause a perception of bias. The Labour Party asked the EHRC to communicate any interim recommendations in the course of the investigation.

The Shadow Chancellor, John McDonnell, looked forward to the investigation's conclusions stating: "I want it quicker actually, I need it speeded up. Let's learn the lessons and then also work with the organisation to implement what recommendations they bring forward. On that basis I'm hoping we'll get a clean bill of health but more importantly we can become much more effective at tackling not just antisemitism but racism, both in our party and society overall."

Jewish Voice for Labour welcomed the investigation by the EHRC. The organisation produced a dossier for the EHRC in response to its request for evidence in relation to its investigation. JVL holds that without making public the complaints and Labour's response when the EHRC shared them ahead of launching the investigation, the EHRC have violated the Equality Act 2006 which requires that they specify who is being investigated and "the nature of the unlawful act" they are suspected of committing, both required by its own terms of reference. Signatories to JVL's letter includes human rights lawyer Sir Geoffrey Bindman QC and University of Oxford professor Avi Shlaim.

In June 2020, Jeremy Corbyn said that the Conservatives in power had "for some reason, which I don't fully understand... decided to take away its independent status and make it part of the government machine".

Criticism of Labour Party advocates
In 2019, those seeking to defend the Labour Party and some members from what they saw as unfair or exaggerated allegations themselves came under attack. Chris Williamson MP was suspended and investigated after he was recorded saying that "The party that has done more to stand up to racism is now being demonised as a racist, bigoted party. I have got to say I think our party's response has been partly responsible for that because in my opinion… we have backed off too much, we have given too much ground, we have been too apologetic...We've done more to address the scourge of antisemitism than any other political party. And yet we are being traduced". As with Jackie Walker and Labour Against the Witchhunt, efforts were made to prevent him speaking at events. Before the 2019 general election, the Labour Party banned Williamson from standing as a Labour candidate.

Pro-Corbyn websites, such as The Canary, were the target of an advertising boycott campaign by Stop Funding Fake News, which said that The Canary regularly published "fake news" and attempts to "justify antisemitism" and that two of its writers had made antisemitic comments. According to Jewish News, the campaign has been backed by Rachel Riley, who campaigns against the party leadership's handling of allegations of antisemitism, while The Canary has called the accusations a smear and those behind the campaign "political Zionists". Research by the Community Security Trust identified a number of pro-Jeremy Corbyn and pro-Labour social media accounts that claimed that allegations of antisemitism in the party were "exaggerated, weaponised, invented or blown out of proportion, or that Labour and Corbyn are victims of a smear campaign relating to antisemitism".

Response to attack on rabbi
After an Israeli rabbi was attacked whilst visiting London in November 2019, Corbyn phoned Rabbi Herschel Gluck, chairperson of Jewish neighbourhood watch organisation Shomrim, to express his concern for and empathy with the community. He tweeted that "We must stop this scourge of antisemitism". Gluck commented that the community appreciated Corbyn's concern and that Corbyn was the only party leader who called.

Chief Rabbi Ephraim Mirvis's statement on the 2019 general election
In his leader's interview with Jeremy Corbyn, Andrew Neil dedicated the first 10 minutes of the 30-minute programme entirely for discussion of Labour's relationship with the Jewish community. This interview drew attention as Corbyn refused to apologise for antisemitism in the Labour Party, even though he had repeatedly done so on previous occasions. The UK's Chief Rabbi, Ephraim Mirvis, made an unprecedented intervention in politics, warning that antisemitism was a "poison sanctioned from the top" of the Labour Party, and saying that British Jews were gripped by anxiety about the prospect of a Corbyn-led government. Justin Welby, the Archbishop of Canterbury, the Muslim Council of Britain and the Hindu Council UK supported Rabbi Mirvis's intervention, if not entirely endorsing it.

Jewish Labour Movement and the 2019 general election
Labour's only Jewish affiliate, the Jewish Labour Movement, said they would not be actively campaigning for Labour except for exceptional candidates.

2020

Keir Starmer's statements
On 4 April 2020, newly-elected party leader Keir Starmer expressed the view that "Antisemitism has been a stain on our party" and apologised to the Jewish community on behalf of the Labour Party, vowing to fight it. Starmer had previously made eliminating antisemitism in the Labour Party one of his main campaign issues, and said he would take steps to eradicate it "on day one" of his assuming party leadership. He also said he would look to fully cooperate with the EHRC's investigation into antisemitism in the party.

Internal investigation into Labour's Governance and Legal Unit

The following week, Sky News reported that an 860-page report into the handling of antisemitism by the party, planned to be sent to the EHRC in addition to previous submissions, would be withheld on the advice of lawyers. The report was the result of an internal investigation into Labour's Governance and Legal Unit, which handles disciplinary cases. The report concluded that there was "no evidence" that antisemitism complaints were treated any differently than other forms of complaint, or of current or former staff being "motivated by antisemitic intent". The report also found that Corbyn's team inherited a lack of "robust processes, systems, training, education and effective line management" and that hostility towards Corbyn by former senior officials contributed to "a litany of mistakes" which "affected the expeditious and resolute handling of disciplinary complaints", including providing "false and misleading information" to Corbyn's office on the scale and handling of antisemitism allegations. The report urges the EHRC to "question the validity of the personal testimonies" of former members of staff. Furthermore, The Independent, which saw the dossier in full, stated that the report said that staffers associated with the right-wing of the Labour Party sought to undermine Corbyn and prevent Labour from winning the 2017 general election in the hope that a poor result would trigger a leadership contest to remove Corbyn as leader.

Former Shadow Chancellor John McDonnell called for the immediate suspension of some former staff named in the document, pending the results of the independent investigation, and the document should be provided to the EHRC investigation into the party. He said: "They've got to have access to all of the information. We've got to rid ourselves of this culture that prevented a Labour government when we desperately needed one but also, by the looks of it, undermined the party's ability to deal with antisemitism effectively" and wrote that "the revelations in the leaked Labour report are a genuine scandal".

On 23 April, Labour's NEC met to agree the terms of reference for the independent investigation into the circumstances, contents and release of an internal report to conclude with its own report being published by mid-July. Several amendments were passed by the NEC, including one moved by Rayner that referred to the offer of whistleblower protections. On 1 May, the NEC appointed a four-person panel to investigate the report on the party's handling of internal antisemitism complaints. Martin Forde QC, a barrister was chosen by the NEC to chair the independent inquiry. He will be supported by three Labour peers: Baroness Debbie Wilcox, Lord Larry Whitty and Baroness Ruth Lister.

In June 2020, Jeremy Corbyn said: "I always knew that there was a culture in the Labour party that was not a healthy one, of an almost self-perpetuating bureaucracy. All organisations have a degree of self-perpetuating bureaucracy about them."

In June 2020, the Labour Party revealed during a High Court hearing, that it had suspended the membership of some party members in order to protect the integrity of its investigation into the leaked anti-semitism report. According to Novara Media, former party director Emilie Oldknow, who featured prominently in the leaked documents, and Patrick Heneghan, Labour's former executive director for elections, campaigns and organisation were among the members who were suspended.

In June, Labour's press office provided a statement prepared by party lawyers to journalists covering the story that defended the comments, describing criticism as "po-faced" and stating: "These were messages exchanged between co-workers in the expectation that they would remain private and confidential and the tone of the language used reflects that." In response, 13 NEC members (one third of the NEC), including representatives from four trade union from Transport Salaried Staffs' Association, Fire Brigades Union, Associated Society of Locomotive Engineers and Firemen and Unite the Union wrote to Labour leader Keir Starmer accusing his office of misleading them about how the party dealt with leaked WhatsApp messages by senior officials detailed in the report and accusing party officials of defending "racist, sexist and abusive" messages about colleagues, and "also directly prejudged the specific issues that Martin Forde's inquiry is considering... and thereby undermines its independence". The NEC members called for an apology and retraction from Starmer.

Sacking of Rebecca Long-Bailey
In June 2020, Rebecca Long-Bailey was asked to resign as Shadow Secretary of State for Education by Labour leader Keir Starmer after she shared a link to an Independent interview with the actor Maxine Peake which contained the following words:
"The tactics used by the police in America, kneeling on George Floyd's neck, that was learnt from seminars with Israeli secret services."
The original article stated that "the Israeli police has denied this". Starmer said that the article should not have been shared by Long-Bailey "as it contained anti-Semitic conspiracy theories". The Independent amended the original article to add a note that "the allegation that US police were taught tactics of 'neck kneeling' by Israeli secret services is unfounded". Peake later stated that she was "inaccurate in [her] assumption of American police training and its sources". The claim had been linked to a report by Amnesty International, but Amnesty said that they had never reported that Israeli security forces had taught the technique.

The Guardian said a "series of individual MPs condemned the decision" and  some did not consider Peake's allegations to be anti-semitic. John McDonnell, shadow chancellor under Jeremy Corbyn, said that "criticism of practices of [the] Israeli state is not anti-semitic". He did not believe that Long-Bailey should have been sacked and stood "in solidarity" with her. NEC member Jon Lansman said: "I don't believe there is anything antisemitic in the [Maxine Peake] interview and sacking Rebecca is a reckless overreaction by Keir Starmer."

Steve Reed
In July 2020, Steve Reed used Twitter to suggest that Conservative Party donor Richard Desmond was "the puppet master to the entire Tory cabinet" in relation to the planning scandal involving Desmond and minister Robert Jenrick. The tweet was criticised as antisemitic for containing a "classic anti-Semitic trope about a Jewish businessman" and Conservative MPs asked Starmer to sack Reed. After Reed deleted the tweet and apologised, no further action was taken against him.

Aftermath of 2019 Panorama programme
In July 2020 the Labour Party was sued for defamation by seven former members of staff who had appeared in the 2019 BBC Panorama programme Is Labour Anti-Semitic? The former staffers said senior Labour Party figures had made statements attacking their reputations and suggesting they had ulterior political and personal motives to undermine the party by appearing in the programme. When the programme was aired, a Labour party spokesperson had called them "disaffected former officials" and said they had "worked actively to undermine" Corbyn and had "both personal and political axes to grind".  In response to the lawsuit Starmer agreed to pay damages to the former staff members and issue a formal apology.

Corbyn expressed disappointment at Starmer's decision and said that the Labour Party was risking "giving credibility to misleading and inaccurate allegations about action taken to tackle anti-Semitism in the Labour Party in recent years" and that the settlements were a "political decision, not a legal one". In response, the show's presenter John Ware decided to sue Corbyn personally. A fundraising campaign, set up with an initial target of £20,000 to help Corbyn with legal fees related to Ware's action, surpassed £270,000 within a few days. Starmer's decision also prompted the Labour Party's largest backer, the trade union Unite led by Len McCluskey, to review its donations to the party. McCluskey said "It's an abuse of members' money. … It's as though a huge sign has been put up outside the Labour party with 'queue here with your writ and get your payment over there' ".

Publication of the EHRC report
On 29 October 2020, the Equality and Human Rights Commission published their report into antisemitism in the Labour Party, which found "serious failings in the Labour Party leadership in addressing antisemitism and an inadequate process for handling antisemitism complaints". The report found evidence of political interference into complaints of antisemitism, failure to provide training to handle complaints of antisemitism, and harassment, in breach of the Equality Act 2010.

After the publication of the report, Jeremy Corbyn said his team had "acted to speed up, not hinder the process", and that the scale of antisemitism within Labour had been "dramatically overstated for political reasons". Corbyn was suspended pending investigation from the Labour Party when he refused to retract his remarks. Corbyn's suspension was welcomed by Labour figures including Margaret Hodge, and Harriet Harman, as well as by the Board of Deputies of British Jews. Corbyn stated he would "strongly contest" his suspension. John McDonnell, Unite leader Len McCluskey, and Momentum expressed opposition to Corbyn's suspension.

2021

Exclusion of alleged far-left factions
In mid-July 2021, the National Executive Committee of the Labour Party voted to ban four factions which they described as being on the far-left, including Resist, Labour Against the Witchhunt, the Labour in Exile Network, and Socialist Appeal, on the grounds that "these organisations are not compatible with Labour's rules or our aims and values." These factions had been accused of obstructing efforts to combat antisemitism within Labour. The party committee also ruled that belonging to these factions is grounds for expulsion from Labour; that future complaints will be handled by a review panel of independent lawyers reporting to an independent appeal body; and that all prospective Labour candidates will be trained by the Jewish Labour Movement in dealing with antisemitism. While the Jewish Labour Movement welcomed the announcement, the bans were condemned by Momentum and Unite the Union for targeting left-wing elements and worsening internal tensions within the party.

2022

Forde Report
The long-awaited Forde Report, written by lawyer Martin Forde in response to the dossier that was leaked in April 2020 (The work of the Labour Party's Governance and Legal Unit in relation to antisemitism, 2014–2019), was finally released on 19 July 2022, revealing that antisemitism had been used as a factional weapon by opponents, and by supporters, of Corbyn in the Labour Party. The report said: "[R]ather than confront the paramount need to deal with the profoundly serious issue of anti-Semitism in the party, both factions treated it as a factional weapon." It also laid bare how senior Labour staff displayed "deplorably factional and insensitive, and at times discriminatory, attitudes" towards Corbyn and his supporters, and revealed that there was a "hierarchy of racism" in the party which ignored Black and Asian people.

Responding to this, Corbyn's former advisor Andrew Fisher wrote: "Forde confirms that reflection is necessary. Cultural change requires painstaking work, not glib assertions of change."

Rebuttals

Labour movement 
In September 2017, general secretary of Unite the Union, Len McCluskey said that the row "was created by people who were trying to undermine Jeremy Corbyn". He stated that he had never heard antisemitic language at a party meeting, adding "Unfortunately at the time there were lots of people playing games, everybody wanted to create this image that Jeremy Corbyn's leadership had become misogynist, had become racist, had become anti-Semitic and it was wrong."

In October 2017, Labour Against the Witchhunt was formed to oppose what they saw as unjustified disciplinary action against Labour activists in relation to alleged antisemitism.

In December 2017, Momentum founder Jon Lansman categorised antisemitism in the Labour Party into three forms: petty xenophobic remarks, of which he "[doesn't] think there's much" in the Party; old-school blood libel type antisemitism, which, according to Lansman, is "extremely rare"; and the Israeli–Palestinian conflict, whereby, Lansman says, "we all understand that when that conflict heats up, it results in dreadful antisemitism. It shouldn't result in that, but it does".

In May 2019, Labour National Executive Committee member Peter Willsman asserted that the Israeli embassy were "behind all this antisemitism" and were "the ones whipping it all up". He added: "They caught somebody in the Labour Party. It turns out they were an agent in the Israeli Embassy", referring to The Lobby.

In June 2019, Labour peer Peter Hain and former Israeli negotiator in peace talks Daniel Levy claimed that the effect of Labour's stance on antisemitism has been "to empower apologists for totally unacceptable Israeli government attacks on Palestinians and the steady throttling of their rights – allowing those apologists to scale new heights in their dishonest attempts to label criticism of such Israeli policy as 'antisemitic'".

In July 2019, the Labour Party in Northern Ireland (LPNI) released a statement opposing the second suspension of Chris Williamson on the grounds that it was "arbitrary and unreasonable" and stated that the "allegations of 'rampant anti-semitism in the Labour Party' have led to detailed research and a number of investigations being conducted to ascertain the truthfulness of the claims. Some of the research has been conducted by world renowned Jewish organisations, with no affiliation, support for, or loyalty to the UK Labour Party. Despite their clear objective and independent credentials; their findings have been almost universally ignored by the UK media." It then went on "it is a fair comment to say that the Labour Party does not have any form of particular problem with anti-semitism. It is also fair to say that Labour Party Members are not to blame for the narrative that suggests that there is a particular problem with anti-semitism in the party. It logically follows that members of the Labour Party should not feel that they should be apologetic about something that has been shown to be false."

In August 2019, former Deputy Leader of the Labour Party and Shadow Home Secretary Lord Hattersley said that he believed that Labour had "managed to expunge the party" of antisemitism.

Jewish activists and organisations 
Some left-wing Jewish groups have disputed the antisemitism claims. These include Jewish Voice for Labour, Jews for Justice for Palestinians, Jewish Socialists' Group, Jewdas and Independent Jewish Voices; all of whom have said that accusations of antisemitism against the Labour Party have a twofold purpose: firstly, to conflate antisemitism with criticism of Israel in order to deter such criticism and, secondly, to undermine the Labour leadership since Corbyn was elected leader in 2015.

In August 2015, dozens of prominent Jewish activists signed an open letter criticising The Jewish Chronicle for what they viewed as its "character assassination" of Corbyn. They wrote: "Your assertion that your attack on Jeremy Corbyn is supported by 'the vast majority of British Jews' is without foundation. We do not accept that you speak on behalf of progressive Jews in this country. You speak only for Jews who support Israel, right or wrong." They continued, "There is something deeply unpleasant and dishonest about your McCarthyite guilt by association technique. Jeremy Corbyn's parliamentary record over 32 years has consistently opposed all racism including antisemitism." Signatories to the letter included Laurence Dreyfus, Selma James, Miriam Margolyes, Ilan Pappé, Michael Rosen and Avi Shlaim.

In April 2016, Richard Kuper, spokesperson for Jews for Justice for Palestinians, said that, while "there is some antisemitism in and around the Labour party – as there is in the wider society in Britain", "there is clearly also a coordinated, willed and malign campaign to exaggerate the nature and extent of antisemitism as a stick to beat the Labour party" under Corbyn. In the same month, Ian Saville, a Jewish Socialists' Group and Labour Party member, said he was "disturbed" by the way antisemitism had "been used to attack the left in the Labour Party."

In April 2016, the Jewish Socialists' Group said that antisemitism accusations were being "weaponized" in order to "attack the Jeremy Corbyn-led Labour party with claims that Labour has a "problem" of antisemitism". It added "A very small number of such cases seem to be real instances of antisemitism. Others represent genuine criticism of Israeli policy and support for Palestinian rights" The statement concluded "The Jewish Socialists' Group sees the current fearmongering about antisemitism in the Labour Party for what it is – a conscious and concerted effort by right-wing political forces to undermine the growing support among Jews and non-Jews alike for the Labour Party leadership of Jeremy Corbyn, and a measure of the desperation of his opponents".

Later that month, 82 "Jewish members and supporters of the Labour party and of Jeremy Corbyn's leadership" wrote an open letter to The Guardian stating that they "do not accept that antisemitism is 'rife' in the Labour party" and that "these accusations are part of a wider campaign against the Labour leadership, and they have been timed particularly to do damage to the Labour party and its prospects in elections in the coming week." The Jewish members and supporters included Miriam David, Ivor Dembina, Professor Stephen Deutsch, Selma James, Miriam Margolyes, Charles Shaar Murray, Ian Saville and Lynne Segal.

In December 2017, Jewdas suggested that the allegations are aimed at discrediting the party and called the reaction to them a "bout of faux-outrage greased with hypocrisy and opportunism", saying it was "the work of cynical manipulations by people whose express loyalty is to the Conservative Party and the right wing of the Labour Party".

In March 2018, Joseph Finlay, the former deputy editor of Jewish Quarterly magazine and co-founder of several grassroots Jewish organisations, wrote in the Jewish News defending Corbyn, describing him as "one of the leading anti-racists in parliament", and that; "Antisemitism is always beyond the pale. Labour, now a party of over half a million members, has a small minority of antisemites in its ranks, and it suspends then whenever it discovers them. I expect nothing less from an anti-racist party and an anti-racist leader." He continued, "There are many threats to Jews – and we are right to be vigilant. ... The idea that Britain's leading anti-racist politician is the key problem the Jewish community faces is an absurdity, a distraction, and a massive error."

In May 2018, the Palestinian-Israeli Socialist Struggle Movement said that they "view Corbyn as a strong opponent of antisemitism and see the attacks being made on him for what they are: attempts to discredit a left-wing politician who has put forward a manifesto seen by capitalists as too radical in favour of working class interests ... The smear campaign against Corbyn is a dangerous attempt to sabotage the struggle for left and socialist solutions".

In February 2019, over 200 Jewish members and supporters of the Labour Party signed a letter published in The Guardian, calling the party under Corbyn an "a crucial ally in the fight against bigotry and reaction" and Corbyn's campaigning consistently in support for "initiatives against antisemitism". They also welcomed Labour's support for "freedom of expression on Israel and on the rights of Palestinians". They felt that the "disproportionate focus on antisemitism on the left, which is abhorrent but relatively rare." The Jewish members and supporters included Prof David Epstein, Mike Leigh, Prof Michael Rosen, Prof Avi Shlaim, Gillian Slovo, Prof Annabelle Sreberny, Walter Wolfgang, Peter Buckman, Erica Burman, Keith Burstein, Miriam David, Michael Ellman, Nick Foster, Susan Himmelweit, Selma James, Ann Jungman, Frank Land, Gillian McCall, Helen Pearson and Ian Saville.

In July 2019, Andrew Feinstein, anti-corruption campaigner and executive director of Corruption Watch pointed out that "Only a very small percentage of Labour members hold anti-semitic views and a YouGov poll in 2015 found Labour displayed the second least amount of any political party, second only to the Liberal Democrats. In 2017, two years into Jeremy Corbyn's leadership, the extent of anti-semitism in Labour had actually dropped, according to polling."

In November 2019, John Bercow, the Jewish former Speaker of the House of Commons and Conservative MP, said he had never experienced antisemitism from a Labour Party member and had known Corbyn for 22 years and did not believe he was antisemitic. In February 2020 Bercow claimed that he had only ever experienced 'subtle' antisemitism from members of his own Conservative Party, and had never experienced any antisemitism from Labour MPs.

In November 2019, 14 British Jews signed a letter published in The Guardian stating: "As British Jews, most of whom have family in Israel and lost family in the Holocaust, and all of us with plenty of experience taking on antisemites face to face across the political spectrum, we are not prepared to be used as cannon fodder in what is really a political siege of the Labour party." The British Jews included Antony Lerman, Lynne Segal, Jacqueline Rose, Miriam David, Brian Klug, Jonathan Rosenhead, Graeme Segal and Stephen Sedley.

Academics and researchers 
In April 2016, independent researcher Jamie Stern-Weiner's review of the cases of antisemitism found that some were represented in the media in a way that treated comments about "Zionists" as being the same as Holocaust denial and comments about antisemitic conspiracy theories. In May 2016, Israeli historian and Oxford University Professor of International Relations Avi Shlaim argued that "charges of Jew-hatred are being deliberately manipulated to serve a pro-Zionist agenda." In the same month, Norman Finkelstein said: "The only plausible answer is, it's political. It has nothing whatsoever to do with the factual situation; instead, a few suspect cases of antisemitism – some real, some contrived – are being exploited for an ulterior political motive. As one senior Labour MP said the other day, it's transparently a smear campaign."

In January 2017, John Newsinger, professor of history at Bath Spa University, wrote: "There has been a sustained attempt made to discredit the Corbynites by alleging that they are somehow responsible for the Labour Party having a serious problem with anti-Semitism, that the Labour left and the left outside the Labour Party is, in fact, anti-Semitic ... There are two points worth making here: first that the allegations are politically motivated smears, perpetrated by people completely without shame, and second that they do considerable damage to the real fight against anti-Semitism." Also in 2017, linguist and philosopher Noam Chomsky said: "I wholeheartedly support the right of anyone to criticise Israel without being branded antisemitic. That goes in particular for Jackie Walker."

In April 2018, 42 senior academics wrote to The Guardian condemning anti-Corbyn bias in coverage of the debate and suggested that "Dominant sections of the media have framed the story in such a way as to suggest that antisemitism is a problem mostly to do with Labour and that Corbyn is personally responsible for failing to deal with it. The coverage has relied on a handful of sources such as the Board of Deputies, the Jewish Leadership Council and well-known political opponents of Corbyn himself." They continued: "It is not 'whataboutery' to suggest that the debate on antisemitism has been framed in such a way as to mystify the real sources of anti-Jewish bigotry and instead to weaponise it against a single political figure just ahead of important elections. We condemn antisemitism wherever it exists. We also condemn journalism that so blatantly lacks context, perspective and a meaningful range of voices in its determination to condemn Jeremy Corbyn." The academics included Lynne Segal, Annabelle Sreberny, Beverley Skeggs, Gary Hall, Neve Gordon, Margaret Gallagher, Maria Chatzichristodoulou, Jill Daniels and Ruth Catlow. One of the academics, Jane Dipple of the University of Winchester, was herself investigated by her university and the Labour party over allegedly antisemitic posts on Facebook. In August 2018 the university said that Dipple no longer worked there but refused to say if she had been sacked or if she had resigned.

Later that April, Israeli historian and socialist activist Ilan Pappé stated that "Corbyn is not an anti-Semite and the Labour Party, until his election, was a pro-Israeli bastion..." and "there is anti-Semitism among all British parties – and much more on the right than on the left." He continued: "It is not the Labour Party that is infested with anti-Semitism; it is the British media and political systems that are plagued by hypocrisy, paralysed by intimidation and ridden with hidden layers of Islamophobia and new chauvinism in the wake of Brexit." In May 2018, Stephen Sedley, a former Court of Appeal judge, dismissed the charge that the Labour Party is "institutionally" or "culturally" antisemitic. He wrote that "an undeclared war is going on inside the party, with pro-Israeli groups such as the Jewish Labour Movement seeking to drive out pro-Palestinian groups like the Jewish Voice for Labour by stigmatising them, and Corbyn with them, as anti-Semitic." He believes that outside bodies like the Board of Deputies of British Jews and the Jewish Leadership Council – "neither noted for balanced criticism of Israel" – weigh in, aided by "generous media coverage".

In July 2018, philosopher and scholar of antisemitism Brian Klug wrote: "It's paradoxical if, at the moment Labour wakes up to the necessity of combating antisemitism in its ranks, it is shouted down because of its failure to deal with it in the past." In October, he wrote: "It appears that two different objectives are being conflated by Jewish leadership: confronting antisemitism and toppling Corbyn." In August 2018, Lorna Finlayson, a lecturer in political philosophy at the University of Essex stated that "No one has yet produced any evidence either that antisemitism is more prevalent in the Labour Party than elsewhere in British society (within the Conservative Party, for instance), or that its incidence within Labour has increased since Corbyn became leader." In September, Professor Rebecca Ruth Gould, a literary theorist, said that "Labour must recognise the internal diversity of the Jewish community and not allow a political faction to silence other points of view, as is happening now to an unprecedented degree."

In October 2018, Goldsmiths, University of London-owned Media Reform Coalition published a report on the coverage of the revised Labour's code of conduct on antisemitism examining "over 250 articles and broadcast news segments." It reportedly found "over 90 examples of misleading or inaccurate reporting." In relation to the IHRA definition of antisemitism, the research found evidence of "overwhelming source imbalance", which over-represented critics of Labour, failed to report on those defending the code or critiquing the IHRA definition and excluded "contextual facts about the IHRA definition." A group including Noam Chomsky, Yanis Varoufakis, Ken Loach, and Brian Eno wrote to The Guardian protesting against the newspaper's reporting. In November the report's main author Dr Justin Schlosberg, wrote an open letter to the Reader's Editor of The Guardian (whom the report had been critical of) criticising the newspaper's lack of reporting or comment on the research, despite it being "endorsed by a wide range of experts as well as public figures." and having "sparked considerable debate on social media platforms and attracted significant attention from independent media outlets."

In March 2019, Neve Gordon, Professor of Politics and Government at Ben-Gurion University of the Negev, wrote: "the real point of contention ... is not about whether the party should tolerate anti-Semitism, but about what anti-Semitism is."

Journalists and authors 

In 2018, Mark Seddon and Francis Beckett conclude that "(t)he debate has become toxic. It's all abuse and bullying and point-scoring. It long ago ceased to concentrate on the protection of British Jews on one hand, and the creation of a better and more equal society in Britain on the other." For Matt Seaton the controversy over Labour's attitudes to Jews and antisemitism is a proxy fight whose real conflict is one of a battle for the soul of the party waged between social democrats and traditional anti-imperialist socialists. Rob Ferguson locates the specific attack on Jeremy Corbyn in the UK in the context of wider international developments since 1967 and particularly from the early 2000s.

In July 2018, writer and scholar of antisemitism Antony Lerman wrote: "It's hard to believe, after the battering Labour has experienced over the issue of antisemitism in the party since Jeremy Corbyn was elected leader and the fact nothing the party has done has succeeded in fully placating its critics, that officials expected anything approximating universal approbation. But the new code [of conduct] had barely seen the light of day before it was being condemned in the harshest terms by all and sundry..." In September, he noted "...The default mode of almost all the mainstream media is to take as given that the party is institutionally antisemitic" and "the ever wilder doubling-down on painting Corbyn an antisemite and the increasingly desperate attempts to oust him from the leadership using hatred of Jews as a weapon with which to achieve this."

In August 2018, author Lev Golinkin wrote: "so many others are, too, for anti-Semitism that's at least as dangerous. And yet the same leaders and institutions who are up in arms over Britain's Labor Party have failed, over and over, to express appropriate outrage" and "a case can be made that for many of these institutions, people like Corbyn and Farrakhan are manna from heaven, because they allow them to show the world how fiercely they fight anti-Semitism without actually having to do so in places where it's inconvenient." Israeli journalist and author Gideon Levy called Corbyn "a paragon of a leftist, one who has fought his whole life for the values he believes in." He added: "Leave the incitement campaign against Corbyn and wish him luck: He's a man of conscience, and I hope he'll be Britain's prime minister. It could be good for Israel as well." In November 2019, Levy wrote "The new and efficient strategy of Israel and the Zionist establishment brands every seeker of justice as an anti-Semite, and any criticism of Israel as hatred of Jews. Corbyn is a victim of this strategy, which threatens to paralyze and silence Europe with regard to Israel."

Writer Richard Seymour wrote: "...allegations that Labour is institutionally antisemitic, or that Corbyn himself is a racist, cut against, rather than with, the grain of what people already suspect to be true. Those who dislike Corbyn overwhelmingly think he's a politically correct peacenik, not a Jew-hater."

In August 2018, American scholars Noam Chomsky and Norman Finkelstein, called the criticism of Corbyn and Labour 'insane' and 'hysteria' and led by powerful interests, with Chomsky arguing that the aim is to undermine Corbyn's attempt to create a political party responsive to the electorate, and Finkelstein asserting that, given the lack of evidence, the campaign was a calculated hoax. In May 2019, Finkelstein called the allegations of antisemitism "witch-hunt hysteria". In July 2019, Chomsky said: "The way charges of anti-semitism are being used in Britain to undermine the Corbyn-led Labour Party is not only a disgrace but also ... an insult to the memory of the victims of the Holocaust."

In February 2019, journalist and author Jonathan Cook noted that a Labour Party report by Jennie Formby providing numbers on Labour antisemitism cases "decisively undercut" the claims of Corbyn's critics "not only of endemic anti-semitism in Labour, but of any significant problem at all". In November 2019, he said that "The media and Israel lobby may have been largely successful in recruiting British Jews and many others to their self-serving campaign to stop Corbyn becoming prime minister..." In April 2019, historian and University of Buckingham Professor of Politics Geoffrey Alderman wrote in the Jewish Telegraph that Jeremy Corbyn "has an impressive demonstrable record of supporting Jewish communal initiatives". In May, he wrote in The Spectator that "I will agree that from time to time, as backbench MP and party leader, Corbyn has acted unwisely. But the grounds for labelling him an anti-Semite simply do not exist."

In October 2019, Greg Philo, lead author of Bad News for Labour: Antisemitism, the Party and Public Belief remarked in an interview with Jacobin magazine that "Both the BBC and even a paper like the Guardian have contributed to public misunderstanding of this issue. They have a moral duty to discuss the new evidence and analysis that we have offered. But both have not covered it. That is a key source of their power — they can impose silence and simply refuse to discuss their own role." Palestinian author and academic Ghada Karmi wrote that the book "shows Labour is not 'institutionally racist' but the victim of an orchestrated campaign of unfounded accusations of antisemitism."

Surveys and studies

General population 

In 2015, 2016 and 2017, the Campaign Against Antisemitism (CAA) commissioned YouGov to survey British attitudes towards Jews. The 2017 survey found that supporters of the Labour Party were less likely to hold antisemitic views than those of the Conservative Party or the UK Independence Party (UKIP), while those of the Liberal Democrats were the least likely to hold such views. 32% of Labour supporters endorsed at least one "antisemitic attitude", as defined by the CAA, compared to 30% for the Liberal Democrat, 39% for UKIP supporters, and 40% for the Conservatives.

A Populus poll during August 2018 found the wider British public did not pay much attention to the prominent news coverage over antisemitism in the Labour Party. No more than 5% rated it as the news story they had noticed most.

A study into contemporary antisemitism in Britain by the Institute for Jewish Policy Research (JPR) in September 2017 found that "Levels of antisemitism among those on the left-wing of the political spectrum, including the far-left, are indistinguishable from those found in the general population. Yet, all parts of those on the left of the political spectrum – including the 'slightly left-of-centre,' the 'fairly left-wing' and the 'very left-wing' – exhibit higher levels of anti Israelism than average." It went on, "The most antisemitic group on the political spectrum consists of those who identify as very right-wing: the presence of antisemitic attitudes in this group is 2 to 4 times higher compared to the general population." It continued: "However, in relation to anti-Israel attitudes, the very left-wing lead: 78% (75–82%) in this group endorse at least one anti-Israel attitude, in contrast to 56% in the general population, and 23% (19–26%) hold 6–9 such attitudes, in contrast to 9% in the general population. Elevated levels of anti-Israel attitudes are also observed in other groups on the political left: the fairly left-wing and those slightly left-of-centre. The lowest level of anti-Israel attitudes is observed in the political centre and among those who are slightly right-of-centre or fairly right-wing." The report, however, found that "...anti-Israel attitudes are not, as a general rule, antisemitic; but the stronger a person's anti-Israel views, the more likely they are to hold antisemitic attitudes. A majority of those who hold anti-Israel attitudes do not espouse any antisemitic attitudes, but a significant minority of those who hold anti-Israel attitudes hold them alongside antisemitic attitudes. Therefore, antisemitism and anti-Israel attitudes exist both separately and together." The study stated that in "surveys of attitudes towards ethnic and religious minorities... The most consistently found pattern across different surveys is heightened animosity towards Jews on the political right..." and that "The political left, captured by voting intention or actual voting for Labour, appears in these surveys as a more Jewish-friendly, or neutral, segment of the population."

British Jews 

In 2017,  a poll commissioned by Campaign Against Antisemitism of 1,864 British Jewish adults found that 83% (in 2016, 87%) felt that the Labour Party was too tolerant of antisemitism among its MPs, members, or supporters.

A Survation poll by The Jewish Chronicle prior to the 2017 general election found that 13% of Jews intended to vote for Labour, an increase from the 8.5% in May 2016. When asked to rank the degree of "antisemitism among the political party's members and elected representatives" between 1 (low) to 5 (high), Jews ranked Labour at 3.94, compared with 3.64 for UKIP, 2.7 for the Liberal Democrats, and 1.96 for the Conservatives.

In September 2018, a Survation survey conducted for The Jewish Chronicle found that 85.9% of British Jews considered Jeremy Corbyn antisemitic, and 85.6% considered the Labour Party to have "high" or "very high" levels of antisemitism within the party's members and elected representatives. This compares to 1.7% and 6.1% for Theresa May and the Conservative Party respectively. This was an increase from 69% who considered the party to have "high" or "very high" levels of antisemitism in 2017.

A poll conducted for The Jewish Chronicle by Survation in October 2019 showed that 87% of British Jews believed that Corbyn was antisemitic, with 47% "seriously considering" leaving the country if Corbyn became Prime Minister.

Labour Party members 

In May 2016, a YouGov poll found that 49% of Labour members felt that the party did not have a problem with antisemitism, 47% agreed that it was a problem, but "no worse than in other parties, while 5% thought that antisemitism is a bigger problem in Labour than in other parties. In March 2018, a poll showed 77% of Labour members believed the charges of antisemitism to be deliberately exaggerated to undermine the leader or stop criticism of Israel, while 19% said it was a serious issue. A July 2019 poll by YouGov amongst Labour Party members found that 70% of members thought that antisemitism in the party was a "genuine" problem.

See also
 Antisemitism in the UK Conservative Party
 Islamophobia in the UK Conservative Party
 Racism in the UK Conservative Party
 The Lobby (TV series)

Notes

References

Sources

Bibliography

General references

Further reading 

 Allington, Daniel. "Judeophobic Antisemitism among British Voters, 2016-2020." Journal of Contemporary Antisemitism 3.2 (2020) online. 
 Bolton, Matthew. "Conceptual Vandalism, Historical Distortion: The Labour Antisemitism Crisis and the Limits of Class Instrumentalism." Journal of Contemporary Antisemitism 3.2 (2020) online.
 
 
 
  Colin Schindler is emeritus professor at the School of Oriental and African Studies, University of London, and the founding chair of the European Association of Israel Studies.
  Alan Johnson is a British political theorist and activist.
  Ambalavaner Sivanandan was Director Emeritus of the Institute of Race Relations; E. Fekete is its director; Jenny Bourne is co-editor of Race & Class.
 Comparison of IHRA and Labour Party Definitions of Antisemitism, Jewish Voice for Labour, 21 July 2018
 
 
 

Antisemitism in the United Kingdom
Labour Party (UK)
Left-wing antisemitism
New antisemitism